Paul Sophus Epstein (Warsaw, Vistula Land, Russian Empire, March 20, 1883 – Pasadena, California, United States, February 8, 1966) was a Russian-American mathematical physicist. He was known for his contributions to the development of quantum mechanics, part of a group that included Lorentz, Einstein, Minkowski, Thomson, Rutherford, Sommerfeld, Röntgen, von Laue, Bohr, de Broglie, Ehrenfest and Schwarzschild.

Paul Epstein's parents, Siegmund Simon Epstein and Sarah Sophia (Lurie) Epstein were of a middle class Jewish family. He said that his mother recognized his potential at the age of four years and predicted that he would be a mathematician. He went to the Hochschule in Minsk, and from 1901-1905 studied mathematics and physics at the Imperial University of Moscow under Pyotr Nikolaevich Lebedev. In 1909 he graduated, and became a Privatdozent at the University of Moscow. In 1910 he went to Munich, Germany, to do research under Arnold Sommerfeld, who was his advisor, and Epstein was granted a Ph.D. on a problem in the theory of diffraction of electromagnetic waves. from the Technische Universität München, in 1914. At the outbreak of World War I he was in Munich, and considered an "enemy alien". Thanks to Sommerfeld's intervention he was allowed to stay in Munich as a private citizen, and could continue with his research. By that time Epstein became interested in the quantum theory of atomic structure. In 1916, he published a seminal paper explaining the Stark effect using the Bohr Sommerfeld ("old") quantum theory.
After the war he went to Zurich, where he remained for two years. He moved to Leiden in 1921, to become Hendrik Lorentz' and Paul Ehrenfest's assistant. Shortly afterwards he was recruited by Robert Millikan to come to the California Institute of Technology, where he remained for the rest of his career. In 1922 he published 3 papers on Bohr's quantum mechanics in the Zeitschrift für Physik and one in the Physical Review. In 1926 he published the paper "The Stark Effect from the Point of View of Schrodinger's Quantum Theory" in the Physical Review, as well as "The New Quantum Theory and the Zeeman Effect" (1926), and "The Magnetic Dipole in Undulatory Mechanics" (1927).

In 1920 Epstein calculated the effect of Polflucht as a possible causing force of Wegener's continental drift. His value was about 10^-6 of the gravitational force. Some years later other geophysicists could show that the Polflucht force is far too weak to cause plate tectonics. The toughness of the sublayers of the Earth's crust is much more stronger than assumed by Epstein.

In 1930 he was elected a member of the National Academy of Sciences. In 1930, Epstein married Alice Emelie Ryckman, and the couple had a daughter Sari (Mittelbach). After World War II, concerned that some young American intellectuals were becoming attracted to communism, he joined the American Committee for Cultural Freedom and in 1951 he served as one of the three US delegates to the seminar the Congress held in Strasbourg.

As well as quantum theory, Epstein also published papers in other fields. Examples include ""Zur Theorie des Radiometers" (1929), "Reflection of Waves in an Inhomogeneous Absorbing Medium" (1930) and "On the Air Resistance of Projectiles" (1931). Other subjects that he worked on were the settling of gases in the atmosphere, the theory of vibrations of shells and plates and the absorption of sound in fogs and suspensions. He retired as Emeritus Professor at Caltech in 1953 and continued to serve as a consultant for a number of industrial companies. One of the significant reports he wrote during this period was "Theory of Wave Propagation in a Gyromagnetic Medium" (1956).

Epstein had other interests as well. He was very interested in Freudian psychology and was one of the founding members of a Psychoanalytic Study Group (together with Thomas Libbin) that later merged into the  Los Angeles Institute for Psychoanalysis.  In the 1930s he published two articles in the monthly literary and scientific magazine Reflex - "The Frontiers of Science" and "Uses and Abuses of Nationalism". Although he was not an active Zionist, Epstein served as a member of the American National Society of Friends of the Hebrew University and was very friendly with the prominent Israeli  mathematician Abraham Fraenkel. The Epstein Memorial Fund was established through donations from more than fifty of his former students and a bronze bust of Epstein stands in the Physics and Mathematics section of the Millikan library at Caltech.

See also
Stark effect

Notes

External links

 Jesse W.M. DuMond, Paul Sophus Epstein, Biographical Memoirs V.45 (1974), National Academy of Sciences (NAS)
 Caltech Archives Oral Histories Online Interview with Paul S. Epstein
 Oral history interview transcript with Paul Sophus Epstein on 25 May 1962, American Institute of Physics, Niels Bohr Library & Archives - Session I
 Oral history interview transcript with Paul Sophus Epstein on 26 May 1962, American Institute of Physics, Niels Bohr Library & Archives - Session II
 Oral history interview transcript with Paul Sophus Epstein on 2 June 1962, American Institute of Physics, Niels Bohr Library & Archives - Session III
National Academy of Sciences Biographical Memoir

1883 births
1966 deaths
People from Warsaw Governorate
Russian people of Polish-Jewish descent
American people of Polish-Jewish descent
20th-century American mathematicians
20th-century American physicists
Russian mathematicians
Moscow State University alumni
Technical University of Munich alumni
California Institute of Technology faculty
Members of the United States National Academy of Sciences
Fellows of the American Physical Society
Emigrants from the Russian Empire to the United States